Osmania General Hospital (OGH) is one of the oldest hospitals in India located at Afzal Gunj, Hyderabad and is named after its founder – Mir Osman Ali Khan, the last Nizam of Hyderabad. It is run by the Government of Telangana, and is one of the largest in the state. It was built at a construction cost of 2,00,00,000.

The hospital building, a heritage structure is in dire need of repairs and renovation.

History
The Afzal Gunj Hospital, the predecessor of the Osmania General Hospital, was established in 1866 by Salar Jung I.

The present hospital building was completed in 1919 on orders of the last Nizam of Hyderabad, Mir Osman Ali Khan. It was designed by British architect Vincent Jerome Esch and Nawab Khan Bahadur Mirza Akbar Baig in Indo-Sarcenic style. In 1926, the wards of the Afzal Gunj hospital were transferred to the new building.

The history of the hospital includes Dr. Yusuf Mirza, the 1st RMO (Resident Medical Officer).

Dr. K Gopal Rao was one of the team of doctors when started along with the RMO. Names of these doctors are still there at the General Ward entrance.

In 2015, the Chief Minister of Telangana, K. Chandrashekhar Rao announced a plan to demolish the building. This sparked outrage among heritage activists, and he immediately retracted the statement.

Himayat Ali Mirza, the great-grandson of Mir Osman Ali Khan, joined hands with the INTACH (Indian National Trust for Arts and Cultural Heritage). He believes minor renovations could improve the hospital building to restore the Osmania General Hospital.

Facilities 
The hospital has more than a thousand beds.

See also
:Category:Establishments in Hyderabad State

References

Hospital buildings completed in 1910
Hospitals established in 1910
Hospitals in Hyderabad, India
Heritage structures in Hyderabad, India
Establishments in Hyderabad State
Hospitals established in Hyderabad State
20th-century architecture in India